Laurence Côte (born 11 February 1966) is a French actress and writer.  She has appeared in such films as Thieves, Up, Down, Fragile and Gang of Four.

External links

French film actresses
Cours Florent alumni
Living people
French women writers
1966 births
Actresses from Lyon
Most Promising Actress César Award winners